Veli Musa Dedi (5 April 1912-3 February 1995), was an Albanian general, technical director of the Albanian Army  and the commander of the Garrison of Tirana. He was a prominent Albanian general who served in the Spanish Civil War and served in France during World War II, taking part in the Battle of Marseille in 1944.

Life 
Veli Dedi was an ethnic Albanian, born in the village Dediq which belongs to the district of Medveđa that is located in the region of Gollak.He attended primary school in Medveđa and Gazdare, secondary school in Leskoc and Faculty of Engineering in Belgrade. In 1932, at the age of 20, he came to Albania and graduated from the Royal Military School in Tirana.

Participation in the Spanish and French War 

During the Spanish Civil War he carried out the duty of operational chief of pioneers of Brigade XV. Later on he fled to France where he joined the French resistance forces by fighting in the Battle of Marseille, and in August 1944, he was promoted Major and Veli Dedi, thanks to his ability, surrendered to 37 thousand fascists, who were fighting to destroy the whole of Marseilles. He managed to persuade them to surrender thanks to the recognition of all international conventions in a professional and detailed manner and with the security guaranteed by the French units. Veli Dedi was also a member of the French Communist Party.

Death 
On February 3, 1995. Mayor General Veli Dedi died in Tirana. The funeral of Major General Veli Ded, as an experienced combatant of Spain and as commander of the liberation operations of the Department of Marseille, as a loyal soldier of the Albanian nation, as a long-time deputy of the Bajram Curri district, was held with state honors. The telegrams from the President, the Ministry of Defense and Albania's veterans were read at the funeral service. Veli Dedi also received an award as Hero of the People

References 

Albanian people of the Spanish Civil War
1912 births
1995 deaths
Albanian military personnel